The 2002 Aaron's 499 was a NASCAR Winston Cup Series racing event that was held on April 21, 2002, at Talladega Superspeedway in Talladega, Alabama. Dale Earnhardt Jr. of Dale Earnhardt, Inc. won the race, his first of the season and the second of his four straight wins at Talladega. His teammate Michael Waltrip finished second and Kurt Busch finished third.

Entry list

Qualifying
The drivers who failed to qualify were Rick Mast, Shawna Robinson, Bobby Gerhart, and Dick Trickle. Jimmie Johnson won the pole.

Race recap 
From the green flag, Jimmie Johnson got off to a good start, leading the first eight laps. On lap 8, Dale Earnhardt Jr. passed Johnson and assumed the lead for all but two of the next 42 laps; Jeremy Mayfield led lap 33, and Michael Waltrip led lap 40. On lap 50, Sterling Marlin claimed the lead, and led two laps before Matt Kenseth passed him for the lead. Kenseth led until lap 56, when Earnhardt Jr. regained the lead. Earnhardt Jr. led until lap 65, when Mayfield assumed the lead, again for only a lap before losing the lead to Earnhardt. He continued to lead until lap 82 when Waltrip claimed it again. Waltrip led until lap 95, when Ryan Newman passed him and led lap 96. Earnhardt Jr. claimed the lead on the next lap and led until lap 105, for a cycle of green flag pit stops. During these pit stops, the lead cycled through Mark Martin, Jeff Burton and Kenseth before returning to Earnhardt Jr. on lap 114. On lap 116, the first caution came out for debris. Kenseth assumed the lead under caution, but Earnhardt Jr. got the lead back at the restart on lap 120. Over the next few laps, the lead would change between Martin, Kenseth, and Newman, before Earnhardt Jr. got a big lead on lap 131. He would lead the next 31 laps.

On lap 141, Newman got out of the race when his car had an engine failure, and was credited with a last place finish.

On lap 163, Dale Jarrett managed to take the lead away from Earnhardt Jr. For the next two laps, Earnhardt Jr. and Jarrett were racing almost side-by-side. A lap later, a very large crash on the back straightaway brought out the second caution. It started when Jimmie Johnson shuffled Kyle Petty out of line in turn 1. Coming on to the backstretch, Petty found a spot in line, but the whole field bunched up behind him, causing Mike Wallace to force Tony Stewart against the outside wall. A 24-car crash unfolded, one day after the largest recorded crash in NASCAR history (30 cars) occurred in exactly the same location in the Busch race. Collected alongside Wallace and Stewart were Steve Park, Rusty Wallace, Mike Skinner, Terry Labonte, Mark Martin, Casey Atwood, Bill Elliott, Johnny Benson, Matt Kenseth, Bobby Labonte, Jeremy Mayfield, Elliott Sadler, Kevin Harvick, Robby Gordon, Ricky Craven, Jimmy Spencer, John Andretti, Steve Grissom, Bobby Hamilton, Geoff Bodine, and Ricky Rudd. Sadler took the biggest hit in the wreck by slamming the corner of the inside wall on the right side, while Benson had to be pulled out of his car after it caught fire on pit road. However, all of the drivers involved escaped injury. It was the largest recorded Big One in Cup history until the following year's spring Talladega race. 

Earnhardt Jr. assumed the lead from Jarrett after pit stops under caution and led the last 23 laps to win. With ten laps to go, oil leaked from Stewart's car and Martin's wounded car stalled. The race was temporarily red-flagged to clean the track. With four laps left, the green flag waved. Earnhardt Jr. led the four lap shootout, managing to hold off Waltrip and beat his teammate to the line by 0.100 seconds. Attendance figures were never recorded for this event. All of the drivers were born in the United States of America. This would primarily become the status quo of the Sprint Cup Series until the introduction of Juan Pablo Montoya at the 2006 Ford 400.

Ryan Newman's last-place finish was the only DNF due to a problem other than crash damage. Winnings for this race ranged from the winner's purse of $184,830 ($ when adjusted for inflation) to the humble last-place winnings of $58,022 ($ when adjusted for inflation). Compared to the previous day's Busch race crash, in which only three cars had finished on the lead lap, 21 cars finished on the lead lap in the Cup race.

Race results

Race Facts
 Race Time: 3:08:41 
 Average Speed: 159.022 mph 
 Margin of Victory: 0.060 sec 
 Cautions: 3 for 19 laps 
 Lead changes: 26  
 Percent of race run under caution: 10.1%
 Average green flag run: 42.2 laps

References

Aaron's 499
Aaron's 499
NASCAR races at Talladega Superspeedway